Western Catholic may refer to:

 The Latin Church, the sole particular church sui juris of the Catholic Church considered part of Western Christianity
 The Holy See, head see of the Catholic Church

See also
 Catholic (disambiguation)
 Catholic Church (disambiguation)
 Catholic (term)
 Roman Catholic Church (disambiguation)
 Roman Catholic (term)